Vol. I is the debut album by Portuguese instrumental band Dead Combo. The album was released through Portuguese label Transformadores.

Track listing
All songs composed by Tó Trips and Pedro V. Gonçalves

 "Janela (Mediterrânica)" – 1:31
 "Mujitos Summer" – 3:09
 "Pacheco" – 2:02
 "Eléctrica Cadente" – 3:01
 "Polaroid Omelete E Os Três Miseráveis Saxes Barítonos" – 2:46
 "Ribot" – 2:57
 "Rumbero" – 2:53
 "Rua Das Chagas" – 3:11
 "Tejo Walking" – 2:24
 "Um Homem Atravessa Lisboa Na Sua Querida Bicicleta" – 3:14
 "Me And My Friend Moonquake" – 1:24
 "Viúva Negra #1" – 2:40
 "Radiot" – 3:03
 "Aos Zig Zag's" – 1:38
 "Fiji Dream" – 1:52
 "Cacto" – 4:29
 "Eléctrica Cadente (Versão Orquestra)" – 4:07

Personnel
Tó Trips - Electric Guitar, Acoustic Guitar (on "Rua Das Chagas" and "Radiot")
Pedro V. Gonçalves - Double Bass, Melodica (on "Pacheco"), Hammond (on "Ribot"), Inverted Guitar (on "Me And My Friend Moonquake")
Sérgio Nascimento - Drums
Gui - Baritone Saxophone (on "Polaroid Omelete E Os Três Miseráveis Saxes Barítonos")
Zé Pedro - Electric Guitar (on "Viúva Negra #1")
Nuno Rebelo - Acoustic Guitar (on "Aos Zig Zag's")
Orquestra Sinfónica Da Cidade Dos Mortos (on "Eléctrica Cadente (Versão Orquestra)")
Johannes Krieger - Trumpet (on "Eléctrica Cadente (Versão Orquestra)")
John Mallison - Conductor (on "Eléctrica Cadente (Versão Orquestra)")

References
Source: Vol. I inside booklet
http://www.myspace.com/deadcombo

2004 debut albums
Instrumental albums
Dead Combo albums